Human Music is an album by American electronic music composer Jon Appleton and multi-instrumentalist Don Cherry featuring performances recorded in 1969 and 1970 and first released on the Flying Dutchman label.

Reception

The album received a Swing Journal award in 1971.

The AllMusic site awarded the album 3 stars.

The authors of The Penguin Guide to Jazz Recordings wrote: "Ahead of its time and inevitably neglected on first... release, electronics man Jon Appleton imaginatively processes Cherry's trumpet and flute sounds."

Track listing
All compositions by  Jon Appleton and Don Cherry 
 "BOA" - 13:15
 "OBA" - 7:30
 "ABO" - 11:00
 "BAO" - 9:43

Personnel
Jon Appleton - synthesizer, electronics
Don Cherry - flute, wood flute, bamboo flute, kalimba, earthquake drums, cornet with traditional mouthpiece and bassoon reed

References

1970 albums
Albums produced by Bob Thiele
Flying Dutchman Records albums
Don Cherry (trumpeter) albums
Jon Appleton albums